There are many and diverse political parties in the Philippines. Most party membership consists primarily of political figures and leaders, with little or no grassroots membership.

The Philippines has a multi-party system with numerous political parties, in which no one party often has a chance of gaining power alone, and parties must work with each other to form coalition governments for political expediency and convenience. Since no political parties have sustaining membership to which party leaders are developed, most of the political parties have the rise-and-fall-and-rise character.
 
There are three types of parties in the Philippines. These are: (a) major parties, which typically correspond to traditional political parties; (b) minor parties or party-list organizations, which rely on the party-list system to win Congressional seats; and (c) regional or provincial parties, which correspond to region-wide or province-wide organizations, respectively.

National parties in office
The following parties have been designated by the COMELEC as major political parties

Main major parties

Other major parties

Other parties represented in Congress

Party-lists represented in Congress
These parties won more than 2% of the vote. For the complete list, see 2022 Philippine House of Representatives election (party-list).

Minor parties
Parties that used to have members in Congress or parties with few or no seats in government

Local parties

Not registered with the government
These are national parties that are not registered with the Commission on Elections:

Historical parties/coalitions

Parties
Allied Party
Alyansa ng Pag-Asa
Bawat Isa Mahalaga
Citizens' Party
Democrata Party
Democratic Alliance
Democratic Party 
Federalist Party 
Ganap Party
Kabalikat ng Malayang Pilipino
KALIBAPI
Koalisyong Pambansa
Labor Party
Lakas ng Bayan 
Lakas–CMD (1991)
Lapiang Malaya
Modernist Party
Movement for Truth, Order and Righteousness
National Socialist Party
Nationalist Citizens' Party
New Leaf Party
Partido Bansang Marangal
Partido Isang Bansa, Isang Diwa
Partido ng Bansa
People’s Progressive Democratic Party
Philippine Falange
Philippine Pro-Socialist Party
Popular Front
Progresista Party
Progressive Party
Reformist Party of the Philippines
Republican Party
Sakdal Party
Social Democratic Party
Social Justice Society
Sovereign Citizen Party
United Opposition

Major coalitions

See also
 Politics of the Philippines
 List of political parties by country

References

Philippines
 
Political parties
Political parties
Philippines